The Honda Crosstour (initially branded the Accord Crosstour) is a mid-size crossover SUV with a sloping rear roofline manufactured by Japanese automaker Honda. It is based on the North American eighth-generation Accord. Sales began in November 2009 for the 2010 model year and were discontinued after the 2015 model year due to slow sales.

Design

The Crosstour was marketed as a "hatchback"/"wagon" variation of the Accord and shared the same platform. The Crosstour was powered by a 3.5-liter V6 engine (choice of either front-wheel or all-wheel drive) or 2.4-liter 4-cylinder engine (front-wheel drive only), with prices that started at $29,670, above those of the Accord sedan (which started at under $23,000). For the 2012 model year, Honda removed the "Accord" prefix, making the name just "Crosstour", and gave its front grille a restyle. An I4 engine for front-wheel drive models was released in late 2011 and put on sale in early 2012.

The Crosstour was a direct competitor to the Toyota Venza, a crossover wagon based upon the Accord's perennial competitor, the Camry. And like the Venza, which was meant to replace the Camry wagon, the Crosstour was considered a successor to the Accord wagon.

In terms of positioning, the Crosstour slotted between the compact CR-V and fullsize Pilot in Honda's crossover SUV lineup, Compared to the Pilot, the Crosstour was longer but had two rows of seating compared to the Pilot's three and had approximately 50 cubic feet less interior space.

The Crosstour was sold in the United States, Canada, Mexico, China, Middle East, Southeast Asia and Russia. Guangqi Honda built and marketed the Crosstour in China.

Facelift
For the 2013 model year, Honda refreshed the Crosstour. A concept vehicle of the Crosstour was unveiled at the New York International Auto Show on April 4, 2012. The revised 2013 Crosstour went on sale on November 20, 2012 with a $500 reduction in price along with increased standard content.  The interior was redesigned, with a more powerful and fuel efficient J35Y1 V6 engine coupled to a 6-speed automatic replacing the previous J35Z2 V6 and 5-speed automatic.  Fuel economy for V6 models was improved to an EPA-estimated 20/30/23 mpg (city/highway/combined) for front-wheel-drive and 19/28/22 mpg for all-wheel-drive.  Inside a 10-way power (2-way lumbar) driver's seat and auto-dimming rearview mirror also became standard on all trims.

Discontinuation
On April 8, 2015, Honda announced that it was discontinuing production on the Crosstour at the end of the 2015 model year due to slow sales. Final production date was August 31, 2015. Another factor in Honda's decision is to free up space on the production line for the CR-V, Acura RDX and also the Acura MDX in 2017.

Safety
The 2013 Crosstour was available with a Forward Collision and Lane Departure Warning Systems. A rear-view backup camera was standard on all 2012 models, a more sophisticated rear camera with wide and top view angles was optional. Excluding the base EX trim a new LaneWatch camera mounted in the passenger side mirror was standard on 2013 models.

IIHS

NHTSA

Reception
The Truth About Cars noted that the initial photos of the Honda Accord Crosstour posted on Facebook received a universally-negative reception with many describing it as "ugly", to which Honda responded with a “Message to Fans” claiming that "the two studio photos we posted didn’t give you enough detail, nor were they the best to showcase the vehicle" and that their "research suggests that the styling does test well among people shopping for a crossover". Numerous publications and online polls criticized the look of the Honda Accord Crosstour, as Honda's attempt to make the Crosstour sleek (i.e. a stretched version of the Accord coupe to accommodate a set of rear doors) resulted in an "abnormally long hood and awkwardly short back end, not quite a coupe or a wagon" with a "ungainly rear overhang" that looked unattractive from a rear 3/4 angle, while the front grille was derisively compared to an alligator.

Some supporters suggested that the Crosstour was an inspiration for fastback (sloped backside) sedans such as the tenth-generation Honda Civic and Audi A7, although the latter two had better proportions all across. Others noted that other contemporary Coupe-styled crossovers that are sleek rather than boxy, such as the BMW X6, BMW 5 Series GT, and Acura ZDX, which have also been criticized for their looks while offering practicality, are luxury vehicles that are much more expensive than the Crosstour (the BMW 5 Series GT and Acura ZDX were also not well-received in North America).

The Honda Accord Crosstour had numerous positive attributes due to being based upon the critically-acclaimed Accord sedan and coupe, while having almost double the storage space of the sedan thanks to its hatchback design. The Crosstour's passenger room was largely identical to that of the spacious Accord sedan. However the Crosstour's sleek profile didn't make its cargo space as practical as more traditional boxy crossover SUVs and wagons, such as the Toyota Venza and Subaru Outback, the latter two which had much more sales success than the Crosstour. Honda's decision to initially offer the Crosstour in one trim, an EX-L V6 with the only options being all-wheel drive and navigation system, gave it a considerable higher price of entry than the competing Venza which offered numerous trims across a wide price range including a base four cylinder engine.

Sales figures

References

External links
 Honda Crosstour - Official US site

Crosstour
Cars introduced in 2009
2010s cars
Mid-size sport utility vehicles
Crossover sport utility vehicles
Front-wheel-drive vehicles
All-wheel-drive vehicles
Vehicles discontinued in 2016
Motor vehicles manufactured in the United States